James Braddock vs. Joe Louis was a heavyweight professional boxing fight for the undisputed heavyweight championship of the world between champion James J. Braddock and challenger Joe Louis.  The fight took place on June 22, 1937, at Comiskey Park in Chicago, Illinois.

Pre-fight
Braddock won the title by defeating Max Baer.  Baer was supposed to have a rematch, but the fight never occurred.  Baer instead fought Joe Louis. Louis defeated Baer, paving the way for Louis to fight Braddock for the title (although between the Baer fight and this title fight, Louis lost to Max Schmeling).  This was Braddock's first and only defense and occurred over two years after winning the title.

Fight
Louis was knocked down early in the fight, but ultimately prevailed by way of knockout in the eighth round.

Aftermath
This fight began an unprecedented reign by Louis that included a 12-year continuous run as champion where he defeated 25 challengers, both records that still stand.

While the bout was the end of Braddock as a major boxing force, fighting only once after this fight, part of his contract with Louis was to gain a portion of Louis' earnings over the next decade.

References

Boxing matches involving Joe Louis
1937 in boxing
1937 in American sports
Boxing in Chicago
1937 in sports in Illinois
June 1937 sports events